is a railway station located in Imari, Saga Prefecture, Japan. It is operated by JR Kyushu and is on the Chikuhi Line.

Lines

Station layout 
The station, which is unstaffed, consists of a side platform serving a single track. The station building is an old timber structure of traditional Japanese design which serves only as a waiting room.

Adjacent stations

History
This station was opened on the same day as an intermediate station on the new track. The Kitakyushu Railway was nationalised on 1 October 1937 and Japanese Government Railways (JGR) assumed control of the station and designated the track which served it as part of the Chikuhi Line. With the privatization of Japanese National Railways (JNR), the successor of JGR, on 1 April 1987, control of the station passed to JR Kyushu.

Passenger statistics
In fiscal 2015, there were a total of 7,092 boarding passengers, giving a daily average of 19 passengers.

Environs
Imari City Tōryō Junior High School

References

External links
Hizen-Nagano (JR Kyushu)

Railway stations in Saga Prefecture
Stations of Kyushu Railway Company
Chikuhi Line
Railway stations in Japan opened in 1935